Maxim Sergeyevich Vlasov (born 11 September 1986) is a Russian professional boxer. He challenged for the WBO interim cruiserweight title in 2018, and the WBO light-heavyweight title in April 2021.

Professional career
On 18 June 2010 Vlasov beat veteran Jerson Ravelo by third round T.K.O.

On 25 February 2011 Vlasov suffered his first loss against Isaac Chilemba. He knocked the Malawian down twice in the 8th round. Despite this Chilemba was able to win the fight on points.

Vlasov has been ranked #10 by the WBC and has won the WBC Baltic title at light heavyweight.

Professional boxing record

References

External links

Middleweight boxers
Super-middleweight boxers
Light-heavyweight boxers
Cruiserweight boxers
1986 births
Living people
Sportspeople from Samara, Russia
Russian male boxers